German submarine U-218 was a Type VIID mine-laying U-boat of Nazi Germany's Kriegsmarine during World War II.

Laid down on 17 March 1941 as yard number 650 and launched on 5 December, she was commissioned  on 24 January 1942 under the command of Kapitänleutnant Richard Becker. She served with the 5th U-boat Flotilla – a training unit; the 9th flotilla from 1 September 1942 to 30 September 1944, the 8th flotilla, and finally with the 11th flotilla, all operational units, the latter from 1 March 1945 to 8 May. She was a member of seven wolfpacks.

Design
As one of the six German Type VIID submarines, U-218 had a displacement of  when at the surface and  while submerged. She had two shafts and two  propellers.

U-218 was fitted with five  torpedo tubes (four fitted at the bow and one at the stern), twelve torpedoes, one  SK C/35 naval gun, 220 rounds, and an anti-aircraft gun, in addition to five mine tubes with fifteen SMA mines. The boat had a complement of between forty-four.

Service history

First patrol
U-218 departed Kiel on her first patrol on 28 August 1942. She moved 'up' the length of the North Sea, through the gap separating Iceland and the Faroe Islands and into the Atlantic Ocean, heading south-west. She damaged Fjordaas in mid-ocean on 11 September. An inspection by the vessel's Master, 1st Mate and Chief Engineer preceded her recovery to the Clyde where she was repaired and returned to service in December 1942.

The escorts of Convoy ON 127 damaged the boat the following day so severely she was obliged to abort the patrol and head for occupied France.

U-218 docked at Brest on 29 September.

Second patrol
Her luck did not improve on her second foray. The submarine was attacked from the air and by surface ships south-west of Portugal on 15 November 1942. The damage inflicted was bad enough to force her to return to Brest on the 25th.

Third and fourth patrols
U-218s third and fourth efforts were in early and mid-summer 1943. They were relatively uneventful.

Fifth patrol
The routine of the boat's fifth sortie was rudely interrupted on 2 August 1943 by an attack by a Vickers Wellington of No. 547 Squadron RAF west of the Bay of Biscay. Six crewmen were wounded, the submarine was severely damaged and once again an early return was required.

Sixth and seventh patrols
Patrol number six was marked by two men falling overboard in heavy weather on 27 September 1943 – they were both picked up 45 minutes later. A month later the boat laid mines near Port of Spain, Trinidad on 27 October.

U-218 had a rare triumph on 5 November when she sank the sailing ship Beatrice Beck east of Martinique with her cargo of cod.

The boat departed Brest for what became her seventh and longest patrol (86 days) on 12 February 1944. She did not return until 7 May. Nevertheless, the waters east of the West Indies were unproductive.

Eighth patrol
The boat was hunted 'mercilessly' for sixty hours from 15 June 1944; she eventually shook off her attackers. She damaged the auxiliary cruiser  on 6 July with a mine laid on the second off Lands End (south-west England). The ship was taken, first to Falmouth, then Glasgow for repairs. She returned to service in late 1944 as HMS Silvio. Meanwhile, the U-boat returned to Brest on 10 July.

Ninth and tenth patrols
Having departed Brest for the last time on 10 August 1944, U-218 laid mines near Lizard Head (Cornwall), before retracing her course west of Ireland. She arrived in Bergen, Norway on 23 September. There now followed a series of short journeys between October 1944 and March 1945.

The boat's tenth and final patrol began with her departure from Bergen on 22 March 1945. She sank the Ethel Crawford on 20 April with a mine laid on the 18th in the Firth of Clyde.

Fate
U-218 surrendered in Bergen on 12 May 1945. She was transferred to Loch Ryan in Scotland in anticipation of Operation Deadlight. She sank while under tow to the scuttling grounds about eight or nine nautical miles north of Inishtrahull (the most northerly island of Ireland) on 4 December.

Afterword
U-218 was also thought to be responsible for sinking the last British ship to be sunk as the result of World War II. The steam fishing vessel Kurd was sunk on 10 July 1945 after hitting a British mine off Lizard Head

The wreck of the U-boat was identified by marine archaeologist Innes McCartney in 2001 off Malin Head.

Wolfpacks
U-218 took part in seven wolfpacks, namely:
 Vorwärts (4 – 15 September 1942) 
 Natter (2 – 8 November 1942) 
 Westwall (8 – 15 November 1942) 
 Rochen (27 January – 25 February 1943) 
 Naab (12 – 15 May 1943) 
 Donau 2 (15 – 19 May 1943) 
 Mosel (19 – 24 May 1943)

Summary of raiding history

References

Notes

Citations

Bibliography

External links

1941 ships
German Type VIID submarines
Operation Deadlight
Ships built in Kiel
U-boats commissioned in 1942
U-boats sunk in 1945
World War II shipwrecks in the Atlantic Ocean
World War II submarines of Germany
Maritime incidents in December 1945